Carl Randall (born 1975) is a British figurative painter, whose work is based on images of modern Japan and London.

Education
Randall is a graduate of The Slade School of Fine Art London (BA Fine Art),  the Royal Drawing School London (The Drawing Year), and Tokyo University of the Arts Japan (MFA & PhD Fine Art).

Portraits of Modern Japan
Randall was awarded The BP Travel Award 2012, for his proposal to walk in the footsteps of the Japanese ukiyo-e printmaker Andō Hiroshige, creating paintings of the people and places of contemporary Japan. His project involved spending time in Japan resulting in a group of 15 paintings exhibited at the National Portrait Gallery in London as part of The 2013 BP Portrait Award exhibition, under the title "In the Footsteps of Hiroshige – The Tokaido Highway and Portraits of Modern Japan". The exhibition subsequently toured to The Aberdeen Art Gallery Scotland, The Wolverhampton Art Gallery England, and then formed his solo exhibition in Japan 'Portraits from Edo to the Present' at The Shizuoka City Tokaido Hiroshige Museum, where the paintings were exhibited alongside Hiroshige's original The Fifty-three Stations of the Tōkaidō woodblock prints. In conjunction with these exhibitions, the book Carl Randall – Japan Portraits was published, illustrating paintings and drawings made in Japan, with a foreword by British author Desmond Morris, and an introduction by the late American writer Donald Richie. A short documentary, Carl Randall – Japan Portraits was also made, showing the artist painting and drawing in Japan. His Japan paintings were also the subject of a 2016 'World Update' interview by the BBC World Service (titled 'Painting the faces in Japan's crowded cities'), and he was also interviewed by CNN about his Japanese work.

Awards, scholarships, residencies, collections 
As well as The BP Travel Award, he also received first prize in the 1998 RWS/Sunday Times Watercolour Competition, he  twice received Second prize in The William Coldstream Painting Competition at The Slade School (1996 & 1997), and was awarded The 2011 Nomura Art Prize by Tokyo University of Arts (for the top PhD graduate exhibition, with his painting 'Roppongi Nightclub' being bought for the University Museum's collection). Scholarships include Daiwa Anglo-Japanese Foundation and MEXT to continue his career as a painter in Tokyo, where he lived for 10 years. He was selected to be the artist in residence at the 2007 Grand Prix Formula 1 Races in Japan, and was interviewed about his paintings for the CNN programme 'The Japanese Grand Prix: F1 in Japan'. He was also invited to be artist in residence in Hiroshima City, to meet and paint portraits of hibakusha (survivors of the atomic bomb), as part of the exhibition Hiroshima Art Document (the resulting series of portrait drawings now in permanent collection of UCL Art Museum, University College London ). In 2014, his large canvas 'Tokyo Portrait' was bought by Fondation Carmignac in Paris, joining works in the collection by artists such as Andy Warhol, Roy Lichenstein, Jean-Michel Basquait, Keith Haring, Jeff Koons, Gerhard Richter. His paintings are also in The Royal Collection and The Shizuoka City Tokaido Hiroshige Museum of Art, Japan. Fine art prints of his paintings are in the collections of King's College, Cambridge; National Poetry Library at Southbank Centre; Zoological Society of London; Channel 4 News Studios; The National Film and Television School; Akram Khan Dance Company; Curtis Brown Group; Aardman Animation, Bristol; Kent University; Hanway Films; Northern School of Contemporary Dance, Leeds; The Comedy Store; Bar Italia Soho.

Exhibitions

His works have been exhibited at a number of exhibitions and galleries, including the BP Portrait Awards (2002, 2012, 2013) at The National Portrait Gallery London; the Royal Academy Summer Exhibition (2003, 2009, 2013, 2019); The Royal Society of Portrait Painters annual exhibition (2012, 2017, 2018, 2020 2022), The Lynn Painter-Stainers Prize (2017, 2018), ING Discerning Eye 2020, the Jerwood Drawing Prize 2012, and 'Small is Beautiful' at Flowers Gallery London (2017, 2018, 2019, 2020, 2021,2022). In 2014, he had two solo exhibitions in central London of work inspired by the people and places of Tokyo: 'Tokyo Portraits' at The Daiwa Anglo-Japanese Foundation (exhibition opened by novelist David Mitchell), and 'Shōzō [肖像]' at Berloni London. In the same year, his solo exhibition 'Portraits from Edo to the Present' was at The Shizuoka City Tokaido Hiroshige Museum of Art in Japan, where his paintings were exhibited alongside Ando Hiroshige's original The Fifty-three Stations of the Tōkaidō woodblock prints (he was also commissioned by the Museum to make a painting for their collection – a contemporary view of Mount Fuji, as depicted in one of Hiroshige's prints). Other exhibitions in Japan include at Tokyo Art Award, Tokyo Metropolitan Museum of Arts, and a solo exhibition at Fuma Contemporary Tokyo, Bunkyo Art. Participation in international art fairs include Art Volta, Basel Switzerland; Art Taipei, Taiwan; Art International Istanbul, Art Osaka and Art Fair Tokyo 2019, Japan. In 2015, he was commissioned by HRH Prince of Wales to paint a World War Two D-Day Veteran for The Royal Collection, exhibited at The Queens Gallery, Buckingham Palace, Portsmouth Museum, and Holyrood Palace, Edinburgh, Scotland. In 2016, his work was exhibited and auctioned at Christie's New York, and in 2020 Christie's London. Earlier in his career, he was included in the 2004 group exhibition 'Being Present' at The Jerwood Gallery London, showcasing eight young UK figurative painters who primarily work from life.

London Portraits
'London Portraits' are a series of 15 paintings made upon Randall's return to the UK, of people who have contributed to their fields in British culture and society. Each sitter was asked to choose a location in London for the background of their portraits. Participants include newscaster Jon Snow, actress Julie Walters, comedian Jo Brand, animator Nick Park, author/illustrator Raymond Briggs, novelist David Mitchell, actress Katie Leung, illustrator Dave McKean, poet Benjamin Zephaniah, movie producer Jeremy Thomas, film-maker Julien Temple, poet Simon Armitage, choreographer Akram Khan, zoologist Desmond Morris, actor Antony Sher and Director of the Royal Shakespeare Company Gregory Doran. A short documentary Carl Randall – London Portraits was made in conjunction with the project, showing Randall meeting and painting the sitters – each explaining their choice of location in London for their portraits. Prints of this series of paintings were displayed at the print room of The National Portrait Gallery, London. In 2017, he created a large monochrome painting depicting Piccadilly Circus London, a busy central London shopping area, which involved meeting and painting the portraits of over 75 London residents directly from life. In 2018, he painted over 55 portraits in a large oil painting depicting central London's Waterloo Bridge and Thames River area(exhibited at The Royal Academy of Arts Summer Exhibition 2019). In 2021, Carl was commissioned by Bob Bob Ricard to create a series of four new portrait paintings of restaurateurs/people in the hospitality industry, for their new £25 million restaurant in the Leadenhall building, the City of London. The portraits depict chef & author Pierre Koffmann; food critic for Bloomberg for 25 years Richard Vines; and restaurateurs/businessmen Leonid Shutov, and Roman & Mikhail Zelman. They are set against London locations such as the City of London, the Barbican centre, and 5 Hertford Street Club in Mayfair.

Lecturing/talks
Randall has been invited to give talks at UCL Art Museum (University College London), The London Art Fair, CharterHouse School, Cambridge University, The British Council in Tokyo, The National Portrait Gallery London, The Daiwa Anglo Japanese Foundation (chaired by the Head of Undergraduate Painting at The Slade School), and at The Swedenborg Society in Bloomsbury - invited by The Japan Society London. In Tokyo, he was Adjunct Professor in Fine Art at Temple University Japan and painting and drawing tutor at Suidobata Art Academy. In London, he has been invited to give painting and drawing workshops at Heatherleys School of Fine Art, The Art Academy and The Royal Drawing School.

Selected works

Books 
 Carl Randall – Japan Portraits (2013)

References

External links 

 
 Japan Portraits – Documentary about Carl Randall in Japan, 11mins 33s (YouTube), 2013.
 London Portraits – Documentary about Carl Randall's 'London Portraits' project, 11mins 6s (YouTube), 2016.
 BBC World Service: World Update. 'Painting the faces in Japan's crowded cities' – BBC interview with Carl Randall, 2016.
 Piccadilly Circus – Short video showing the making of Carl Randall's 'Piccadilly Circus' painting, 1min 42s (YouTube), 2018.
 Waterloo Bridge – Short video showing the making of Carl Randall's 'Waterloo Bridge' painting, 1min 24s (YouTube), 2019.

20th-century British painters
British male painters
21st-century British painters
British portrait painters
1975 births
Living people
Alumni of the Slade School of Fine Art
Tokyo University of the Arts alumni
20th-century British male artists
21st-century British male artists